Abdulla Adnan Al Dakeel (born 3 June 1985) is a Bahraini footballer.

Club career
At the club level, Al-Dakeel currently plays as an attacker for Muharraq Club (Red Wolves).

International career
He has also made several appearances for the Bahrain national football team.

National team career statistics

Goals for Senior National Team

References

1985 births
Living people
Bahraini footballers
Bahrain international footballers
2011 AFC Asian Cup players
Footballers at the 2006 Asian Games
Al Wahda FC players
Al Hala SC players

Association football forwards
Asian Games competitors for Bahrain